John Perry (born June 4, 1969) is an American football coach and former player who is currently the Offensive coordinator at Lamar University. Perry is a veteran NFL Coach with 7 years of experience.  He was previously the WR Coach for the Houston Texans.  He coached Deandre Hopkins to become a 3 Time 1st Team All Pro. Perry was most recently an offensive assistant at Rutgers University.  Perry has been connected to some of the most explosive offenses as a collegiate coach.  Perry served as the head football coach at Merrimack College in North Andover, Massachusetts from 2008 to 2012, compiling a record of 29–21. He played football and basketball at the University of New Hampshire.

Head coaching record

References

External links
 Houston Texans profile

1969 births
Living people
New Hampshire Wildcats football players
New Hampshire Wildcats men's basketball players
Brown Bears football coaches
Dartmouth Big Green football coaches
Georgetown Hoyas football coaches
Hofstra Pride football coaches
Merrimack Warriors football coaches
New Hampshire Wildcats football coaches
Northeastern Huskies football coaches
Houston Texans coaches
People from Lawrence, Massachusetts
Players of American football from Massachusetts
Coaches of American football from Massachusetts